Prichard may refer to:

People
Alan Prichard (1907–1986), New Zealand aviator
Bruce Prichard (born 1963), American professional wrestling personality
Caradog Prichard (1904–1980), Welsh poet and novelist
Gwilym Prichard (1931–2015), Welsh landscape painter
Harold Arthur Prichard (1871–1947), English moral philosopher
 Hesketh Vernon Prichard (1876–1922), later Hesketh Hesketh-Prichard, British explorer, adventurer, sniper, and cricketer
James Cowles Prichard (1786–1848), English physician and ethnologist
John Prichard (1817–1886), Welsh architect
Katharine Susannah Prichard (1883–1969), Australian writer and founding Communist Party member
Mathew Prichard (born 1943), British philanthropist
Paul Prichard (born 1965), English former cricketer
Robert Prichard (born 1949), Canadian lawyer, economist, and academic
Rowland Prichard (1811–1887), Welsh musician
Thomas Octavius Prichard (1808–1847), English psychiatrist and early advocate of humane treatment of the mentally ill
Tom Prichard, American professional wrestler
Vernon Prichard (1892–1949), U.S. Army major general and college football quarterback
William Prichard (disambiguation), three people

Places
Prichard, Alabama, city
Prichard, Idaho, an unincorporated community
Prichard, Mississippi, unincorporated community
Prichard, West Virginia, unincorporated census-designated place
Prichard Creek, a stream in Idaho

Other uses
Prichard House (disambiguation), two houses on the US National Register of Historic Places

See also
Pritchard (disambiguation)